Mark Anthony Harper (born 31 October 1957 in Georgetown, Guyana) is a former cricketer and current head coach of Guyana, a team he represented throughout his playing career. Harper has previously coached the national teams of Bermuda (from 2001 to 2004) and the Turks and Caicos Islands (from 2007 to 2008). Harper's brother, Roger, played international cricket for the West Indies in the 1980s and 1990s.

References

1957 births
Living people
Sportspeople from Georgetown, Guyana
Guyanese cricketers
Demerara cricketers
Guyanese cricket coaches
Guyana cricketers
Coaches of the Bermuda national cricket team
Guyanese expatriates in Bermuda
D. B. Close's XI cricketers